Kovil Esanai is a village in the Ariyalur taluk of Ariyalur district, Tamil Nadu, India.

Demographics 

As per the 2001 census, Kovil Esanai (West) had a total population of 1645 with 791 males and 854 females.

References 

Villages in Ariyalur district